Joseph A. McEachern (born April 10, 1955) is an American politician. He was a member of the South Carolina House of Representatives from the 76th District, serving from 2009 to 2018. He is a member of the Democratic party.

References

Living people
1955 births
Democratic Party members of the South Carolina House of Representatives
People from Dillon, South Carolina
African-American state legislators in South Carolina
21st-century American politicians
21st-century African-American politicians
20th-century African-American people